"Ain't Nobody" is a song by American Contemporary Christian musician and worship leader Cody Carnes. The song was released on September 30, 2022, as the second single from his first live album, God Is Good! (2022). Carnes co-wrote the song with Brandon Lake and Hank Bentley. The single was produced by Aaron Robertson, Austin Davis, Hank Bentley, and Jeff Pardo.

"Ain't Nobody" peaked at No. 10 on the US Hot Christian Songs chart.

Background
On September 2, 2022, Cody Carnes releasing "Ain't Nobody" as a promotional single in the lead-up to the release of his first live album, God Is Good!, being slated for September 30, 2022. Carnes also announced that the song would impact Christian radio on September 30, being the second official single from the album following the digital release of "Good (Can't Be Anything Else)". Carnes shared that the song is "a celebration of the love of Jesus and how it's impacted my life."

Critical reception
Reviewing for Worship Leader, Christopher Watson said "Ain't Nobody" was one of the standout tracks from the album, describing it as a "soulful funk" song.

Composition

Commercial performance
"Ain't Nobody" made its debut at No. 30 on the US Christian Airplay chart dated September 10, 2022. "Ain't Nobody" went on to debut at No. 47 on the US Hot Christian Songs chart dated September 17, 2022.

Music video
The official live performance video of "Ain't Nobody" was published on September 2, 2021, on Cody Carnes' YouTube channel. The video shows Carnes leading the song in worship, filmed at The Belonging Co in Nashville, Tennessee.

Track listing

Personnel
Credits adapted from AllMusic.

 Jacob Arnold — drums, percussion
 Jonathan Baines — choir/chorus
 Lorenzo Baylor — choir/chorus
 Hank Bentley — acoustic guitar, background vocals, electric guitar, Hammond organ, piano, producer, programming
 Chris Bevins — editing
 Alex Bivens — choir/chorus
 Cody Carnes — acoustic guitar, background vocals, percussion, piano, primary artist, vocals
 Jess Carpenter — choir/chorus
 Angelique Carter — choir/chorus
 Mike Cervantes — mastering engineer
 Chad Chrisman — A&R
 Amanda Cockrell — choir/chorus
 Marci Coleman — choir/chorus
 Austin Davis — drums, producer
 Garrett Davis — A&R
 Donte Dowlling — engineer
 Jackson Dreyer — choir/chorus
 Tito Ebiwonjumi — choir/chorus
 Eddie Edwards — electric guitar
 Enaka Enyong — choir/chorus
 Jenna Lee Fair — choir/chorus
 Devin Feldman — engineer
 Carissa Fernald — choir/chorus
 Evan Fernald — piano
 Gavin Garris — choir/chorus
 Sam Gibson — mastering engineer, mixing
 Jayci Gorza — choir/chorus
 Olivia Grasso — choir/chorus
 Brad Guldemond — choir/chorus
 Baily Hager — choir/chorus
 Bernie Herms — Hammond B3
 Chelsea Howard — choir/chorus
 Kari Jobe — background vocals
 Joel Okaah — choir/chorus
 Nicole Johnson — choir/chorus
 Ashley Jolley — choir/chorus
 Graham King — engineer
 Benji Kuriakose — choir/chorus
 Shantrice Laura — background vocals
 Tony Lucido — bass
 Christian Mason — choir/chorus
 Brenton Miles — background vocals, electric guitar, engineer
 Casey Moore — electric guitar
 Noah Moreno — choir/chorus
 Kittie Carreker Morgan — choir/chorus
 Tayler Moses — choir/chorus
 Angela Nasby — choir/chorus
 Jack Nellis — engineer
 Christina Onstott — choir/chorus
 Jeff Pardo — keyboards, producer, programming
 Brady Pendergrass — choir/chorus
 Kelsei Peppars — choir/chorus
 Cory Pierce — electric guitar
 Jordyn Pierce — choir/chorus
 Edwin Portillo — choir/chorus
 Kyle Pruzina — choir/chorus
 Marci Pruzina — choir/chorus
 Aaron Robertson — keyboards, producer, programming, synthesizer
 Alyssa Rodriguez — choir/chorus
 Emily Ruff — choir/chorus
 Matt Sanders — choir/chorus
 Gilbert Sauceda — choir/chorus
 Rylee Scott — choir/chorus
 Setnick T. Sene — choir/chorus
 Sharon Okaah — choir/chorus
 Lydia Shaw — choir/chorus
 Sophie Shear — choir/chorus
 Kendall Smith — choir/chorus
 Zack Smith — choir/chorus
 Kelley Sparks — choir/chorus
 Blake Stafford — choir/chorus
 Cheryl Stark — choir/chorus
 Kirsten Strahley — choir/chorus
 Jordan Stribling — choir/chorus
 Keithon Stribling — background vocals
 Cody Sullivan — choir/chorus
 Bria Valderrama — choir/chorus
 Robby Valderrama — choir/chorus
 Doug Weier — mixing
 Mitch Wong — background vocals
 Steph Wong — choir/chorus
 Shae Wooten — bass, synthesizer bass
 Ashley Wright — choir/chorus
 Daniella Young — background vocals, choir/chorus

Charts

Release history

References

External links
  on PraiseCharts

2022 singles
2022 songs
Cody Carnes songs
Songs written by Cody Carnes
Songs written by Brandon Lake